Sphaerion is a genus of beetles in the family Cerambycidae, containing the following species:

 Sphaerion cyanipenne Audinet-Serville, 1834
 Sphaerion exutum (Newman, 1841)
 Sphaerion inerme White, 1853
 Sphaerion lentiginosum Berg, 1889
 Sphaerion rusticum Burmeister, 1865
 Sphaerion sladeni Gahan in Gahan & Arrow, 1903

References

Elaphidiini